Is Anybody There? is a 2008 British drama film starring Michael Caine and directed by John Crowley. It was written by Peter Harness and produced by David Heyman, Marc Turtletaub and Peter Saraf. The film premiered at the 2008 Toronto International Film Festival under its original title Is There Anybody There? It garnered a nomination from the London Film Critics' Circle for Bill Milner as the Young British Performer of the Year.

Plot
In 1987 Edward (Bill Milner) is a ten-year-old boy who lives at an old people's home run by his parents (David Morrissey and Anne-Marie Duff). Surrounded by death and dying, he becomes obsessed with finding evidence for the afterlife, often using a tape recorder to capture his "encounters".

Edward is helped in his search by Clarence (Michael Caine), an elderly ex-magician in the early stages of dementia who has recently entered the home. They first meet on the road near the home, when he is nearly hit by his camper van. Clarence had been living in it, and is resistant to moving into the home.

Frustrated with having all of the residents in his home (he's lost his room, TV control and general privacy and freedom), Edward sets off the fire alarm. While everyone is out in the rain, he wreaks havoc alone inside.

The next day, Edward passes Clarence's van on his way to school. It's running, and he opens the door to a cloud of carbon monoxide. While he's hospitalized, Edward looks through his things. He has lots of show bills of his past magic acts.

Edward visits Clarence in the hospital, bringing a few things and apologizing. From this point on, the film follows their quest and their friendship, which ultimately allows both Edward and Clarence to come to terms with their respective situations.

Edward shows Clarence a peculiar ritual he does, trying to contact the dead. Magic interests both of them, so Edward learns some tricks to the kids at school. On his birthday Clarence takes them out in the van, but he gets confused in a round-a-bout, causing a pile up. They can't get it started again, so a frustrated Clarence empties it, pushes it into the water, then argues with Edward saying there is no afterlife. Angry, the boy stomps off.

Later on, the home throws a party for Edward's birthday. He's not enthused, until Clarence offers to do magic. The card tricks go well, but one where he's meant to pretend to cut off a finger goes wrong.

Edward organises a bus trip to Clarence's deceased wife's grave. His dementia begins to show, as doesn't believe it's her grave. Edwards' parents pick them up. He believes Edward's mom is his dead estranged wife, so she accepts his apology.

Clarence quietly passes away, but Edward has grown emotionally and, as his parents earlier on had had some problems, they decide to give it another try.

Cast 
Michael Caine as Clarence (magician)
Bill Milner as Edward
David Morrissey as Dad
Anne-Marie Duff as Mum
Leslie Phillips as Reg
Sylvia Syms as Lilian
Peter Vaughan as Bob
Thelma Barlow as Ena
Rosemary Harris as Elsie
Elizabeth Spriggs as Prudence (her final performance)

Production 

Shot on location in Hastings and Chalfont St Giles.
Folkestone Central railway station doubled as a Yorkshire station as Clarence and Edward take a trip on the train for a day out. The sea-shelter on Princes Parade in Hythe was used as a bus shelter in Hull.  St Peter's Church of England Primary school in Folkestone was used as Edward's school in the film.

The ethereal music throughout the film was performed by David Coulter on a musical saw.

Release
The film premiered at the 2008 Toronto International Film Festival under the title Is There Anybody There? It was released in the United States on 17 April 2009 and in the United Kingdom on 1 May 2009.

, the film holds a 65% approval rating on review site Rotten Tomatoes, based on 117 reviews with an average rating of 6.25 out of 10. The website's critics consensus reads: "Though Michael Caine gives an excellent performance, Is Anybody There? features a cliche-filled story that ultimately falters."

References

External links 
Official U.S. website (from Big Beach)

2008 films
2008 drama films
2000s British films
2000s English-language films
BBC Film films
Big Beach (company) films
British drama films
Films about health care
Films directed by John Crowley
Films produced by David Heyman
Films set in 1987
Films shot at Elstree Film Studios
Films with screenplays by Peter Harness